Kwik cricket (known as Kanga cricket in Australia, and Kiwi cricket in New Zealand) is a high-speed version of cricket aimed mainly at encouraging children to take part in the sport, with an emphasis on participation and enjoyment.

The game is based on ideas refined and perfected at Brownhills Comprehensive School, Walsall, and Childer Thornton Primary School, Cheshire, in the 1980’s by brothers Gareth and Eryl Powell - both PE teachers - and presented in partnership to the MCC, with Tom Cartwright (Warwickshire, Glamorgan and England), the Welsh Cricket Association National Coach. Linked to a Dragon Award Coaching Scheme, the game was promoted to link with the Milk In Action, National Milk Board’s drive to get their Kwik Cricket bags into every Primary School in The UK.

Rules
Many of the rules are adapted from cricket, but kwik cricket is played with a plastic bat and ball (for obvious safety and physical reasons), and plastic cones to mark the maximum width of a legally bowled ball. The rules can be altered so that virtually any number of children can play in the time available, and the game can be made easier or more difficult by changing the physical dimensions of the pitch (changing the width of the wickets, increasing the distance between the wickets, widening or narrowing the crease, pulling in or pushing out the boundary, etc.).

For example, continuous kwik cricket can be played by two groups of ten or 12, with each batting for a set period of time, the Lord's Game can be played by two groups of four or five, and pairs kwik cricket works for groups of eight, each playing as a pair and rotating the roles (batsmen; bowler and wicket-keeper; leg side and off side fielders).

Equipment:
2 bats
1 plastic cricket ball
1 wicket keeper helmet
2 sets of stumps
20 cones
1 scoring sheet

In Australia and New Zealand the game is more formal than in the United Kingdom, where the rules include a one-handed catch resulting in the dismissal of the entire team, and rather than plastic cones a nearby landmark is used as a theoretical boundary.

Cones are placed next to the batsman's left and right leg (about one meter away), tennis balls are placed on these cones. In most cases in Australia, if the bowler bowls a no-ball, wide, dead ball, etc., the person batting would hit either of the cones for a "free shot". The fielders cannot move until the batsman hits the ball.

History

The first ‘unofficial’ game of Kwik Cricket was played at the Test Match between England and The West Indies at Old Trafford, Manchester, on Thursday June 30th 1988 during the lunch break. Two Primary Schools from Cheshire - Childer Thornton and Lower Peover -  played 8 a side, mixed teams utilising wooden bats and stumps with a tennis ball. The first ball was bowled by Courtney Walsh (West Indies) and the first shot was dropped at square leg! The game was played in front of the old Pavilion and was met very enthusiastically by the watching spectators. A representative of The National Milk Board was present and, immediately enthused by the prospect of developing the concept, invited the organisers, Gareth Powell and Margaret Roberts to meet with his Publicity Group.  

The format was a traditional one played for many years at Under 11 age at Primary Schools in England and Wales as part of their PE/Skills Development Programme. As a result of the Milk Board’s initiative and hard work by Tom Cartwright in selling the project to the MCC, a set of plastic equipment was provided free to every primary school who requested one. They included bags, bats, stumps, balls, instructions on playing various formats and a set of skills cards. Later bags were sold to schools and clubs, with all proceeds going to Lord's Taverners charity.  

In subsequent years the game was presented at other Test Match venues in the UK. 

The coaching skills programme was taken by Keith Andrew, then Director of Cricket at MCC, and published within his coaching manual.

See also 
 Children's cricket 
 Backyard cricket 
 French cricket

References

External links

The New Zealand Cricket introduction to MILO Kiwi cricket

Short form cricket
Cricket terminology
Children's sport
Forms of cricket